The U.S. Cellular 250 was a 250-lap, 218.75-mile NASCAR Xfinity Series race which was held at Iowa Speedway in Newton, Iowa every summer from 2009 to 2019. It was traditionally held in late July or early August, while U.S. Cellular was the title sponsor every year since the event's inception with different presenting sponsors each year.

The race was canceled in 2020 due to the COVID-19 pandemic before being removed from the schedule entirely in 2021.

Past winners

2015, 2017 and 2018: Race extended due to overtime; 2015 and 2018 took two tries.
2020: Race cancelled and moved to Kansas due to the COVID-19 pandemic.

Multiple winners (drivers)

Multiple winners (teams)

Manufacturer wins

References

External links
 

2009 establishments in Iowa
2020 establishments in Iowa
NASCAR Xfinity Series races
Former NASCAR races
 
Recurring sporting events established in 2009
Recurring sporting events disestablished in 2020